DNU SMBM National Public School is a privately run CBSE school in Dindigul, India.
It is managed by the DNU association which also runs the MSP school in Dindigul.

Origin 
The school was formed by the DNU in 1979. It began with four small huts with kindergarten and entry-level classes, in the grounds of the MSP school. Later they moved into a concrete building and bought the ground from MSP. In 2008 a ground for improving its sports was bought in Balakrishnapuram.

Location 
The school is located in Dindigul, just off the round road. It is located at the junction of Balakrishnapuram road, round road and bus stand road and GTN road.

Growth 
The school, which started as a kindergarten school, grew to a high school then in 2000 to a higher secondary. The school achieved district ranks in +2 board exams and state ranks in tenth public exams.

Primary schools in Tamil Nadu
High schools and secondary schools in Tamil Nadu
Education in Dindigul district
Dindigul
Educational institutions established in 1979
1979 establishments in Tamil Nadu